The following are the national records in athletics in Côte d'Ivoire (Ivory Coast) maintained by its national athletics federation, the Fédération Ivoirienne d'Athlétisme (FIA).

Outdoor

Key:

h = hand timing

OT = oversized track (> 200m in circumference)

Men

Women

Indoor

Men

Women

Notes

References
General
World Athletics Statistic Handbook 2019: National Outdoor Records
World Athletics Statistic Handbook 2018: National Indoor Records
Specific

Ivorian
Records
Athletics
Athletics